Woodman's Markets is an employee-owned American regional supermarket chain based in Janesville, Wisconsin. Founded in 1919 as a produce stand, Woodman's has grown to operate nineteen stores in Wisconsin and northern Illinois. Woodman's appeared on Supermarket News Top 50 Small Chains & Independents list since 2010. All Woodman's locations are open 24 hours a day, although some of them have enacted temporary changes due to COVID, and have a gas station and convenience store close to the store.

History
Woodman's Markets was started in 1919 by John Woodman as a produce stand on the corner of Milton and Sherman Avenues in Janesville. John's son, Willard, later joined his father and in 1921 they built an indoor location on the original produce stand corner. The company continued to grow throughout the middle of the 20th century and in 1956 opened a second Janesville location. The original two stores eventually closed and were replaced by one larger store in 1973. Willard's son, Phil, joined him in managing the company in the 1960s, and remains president today. In 1971 Woodman's opened its first location outside Janesville, in neighboring Beloit. In 1975 Woodman's became the first Wisconsin-based grocery store to begin using UPC scanners. 
 
Since the late 1970s, Woodman's has opened 15 stores throughout Wisconsin and Illinois. The Kenosha location, which opened in 1997, was the largest grocery store in the United States at the time. The 2001 opening of the Rockford, Illinois, store marked the first Woodman's store outside Wisconsin. Woodman's was privately owned by the Woodman family until 1998, when it became a 100 percent employee owned company. In March 2008, Woodman's hit $1 billion in annual sales.

The company previously owned a stake in Roundy's, now a key regional competitor.

Store layout and sales model
Woodman's stores are based on a modified warehouse model, with stores in the 200-250,000+ square foot range. Most new locations are built as an anchor store with several smaller outlets surrounding the store. The company prefers not to take on debt so it opens new stores only every 2–3 years, and remodels existing stores in between opening new stores.

Prices at Woodman's are lower than at many large grocery store chains because of their bulk purchasing model. Most items are stocked on the shelves by employees, but special bulk purchases and other items are sometimes shelved in their shipping cases or stacked in the aisles.

The store brand is Shurfine, which is one of the many brands of Elk Grove Village, Illinois-based private label co-op Topco Associates.

Woodman's allows payment by cash, check, Discover card,  PIN-based debit cards and EBT. Discover card is the exclusive credit of Woodman’s.  
All Woodman's locations are open 24 hours and have 24 hour gas stations in close proximity to the main store. Each station has a convenience store with the gas station, however the small store is only open 6 am to 7 pm. Fast multi-bay Oil change operations attached to that store share the same hours. The gas pumps operate unattended during off hours. Shopping carts are varied, offering electric carts, oversized carts, carts that allow children to be strapped in, and carts for adults with special needs.

Woodman's partners with GrocerKey to offer online shopping with pick up or delivery.

Employee benefits
Despite the company being employee owned, Phil Woodman created controversy in December 2009 by eliminating the company's mental health coverage, complaining that patients could rack up uncontrolled costs for the company.

Locations
Woodman's has nineteen locations:

Illinois
Carpentersville
North Aurora
Rockford
Buffalo Grove
Lakemoor 
Bloomingdale

Wisconsin
Altoona
Appleton
Beloit
Green Bay
Janesville
Kenosha
Madison West
Madison East
Menomonee Falls
Oak Creek
Onalaska
Sun Prairie
Waukesha

References

External links
 Woodman's Markets website

American companies established in 1919
Retail companies established in 1919
Retail companies based in Wisconsin
Janesville, Wisconsin
Supermarkets of the United States
Employee-owned companies of the United States
1919 establishments in Wisconsin